Abubakar Abdul Dzukogi (born 1956) is a Nigerian educator. He serves as the rector of Federal Polytechnic Bida by Muhammadu Buhari. He was the rector from 2015- 2019. He assumed office on  May, 2019.

As the 11th rector, he created a special fund to assist students on their school registration dues, mainly indigenous students.

Controversy 
FPB's governing body requested that Dzukogi be fired. The campaign was led by chair Saganuwon in the Etsu Nupe Abubakar Yahaya palace in Bida. Speaking with Etsu Nupe protesters hoisted banners saying Dzukogi must go, we will not be intimidated, we say no to forced sack, They insisted that process must be followed. Insisting the rector should be sacked, this chaos came across for the dissolution of the sixteen weeks ASUP body and strike that was later resolved by the secretary of National Board for Technical Education (NBTE).

Notes 

Living people
1956 births
Nupe
Nigerian writers
Academic staff of the Federal Polytechnic Bida